Hai Lake–Mount Herman Provincial Park is a provincial park in British Columbia, Canada. Established in 2004, it is 323 ha. and protects regionally significant bog ecosystems and old-growth forests. The park caters to outdoor pursuits such as day hiking, camping, fishing, and hunting.

References

Skeena Country
Provincial parks of British Columbia
Year of establishment missing